The discography of Australian country music artist Diana Trask consists of sixteen studio albums, six compilation albums, and thirty three singles.

Albums

Studio albums

Compilation albums

Singles

References

Notes 

Discographies of Australian artists
Country music discographies